Nyalkal is a village in Medak district of Telangana, India.

It is bounded by Manoor, Raikode, Jharasangam and Zahirabad mandals in Medak district and Bidar district of Karnataka state.

Geography
It has an average elevation of 585 metres (1922 ft).

Demographics
According to Indian census, 2001, the demographic details of Nyalkal mandal is as follows:
 Total Population: 	53,721	in 9,055 Households.
 Male Population: 	27,098	and Female Population: 	26,623		
 Children Under 6-years of age: 8,849 (Boys - 	4,475	and Girls -	4,374)
 Total Literates: 	20,913

Nyalkal village has a population of 3,513 in 2001.

References

External links
 Nyalkal mandal at Wikimapia.org

Mandals in Medak district